Roman Begunov (born 22 March 1993) is a Belarusian footballer who plays for Dinamo Minsk.

Honours
Minsk
Belarusian Cup winner: 2012–13

Shakhtyor Soligorsk
Belarusian Premier League champion: 2020, 2021
Belarusian Super Cup winner: 2021

External links

Profile at FC Minsk website

1993 births
Living people
Belarusian footballers
Association football defenders
Belarus international footballers
FC Minsk players
FC Dinamo Minsk players
FC Torpedo-BelAZ Zhodino players
FC Shakhtyor Soligorsk players